La Doña is the eleventh album by Teena Marie, released on May 11, 2004, on the Cash Money label.

The album includes guest contributions from Rick James ("I Got You" - this was the last recording James made before his death), Gerald Levert ("A Rose by Any Other Name"), Common ("Revelations 3:8 Introduction"), Birdman ("Off the Chain"), MC Lyte ("The Mackin' Game") and Marie's daughter, Alia Rose.

The album peaked at #6 on the Billboard 200, Marie's highest placing (and first top 20 entry) on that chart.  It also reached #3 on the R&B Albums chart.

The lead-off single "Still in Love" (which samples Al Green's 1972 track "What a Wonderful Thing Love Is") was Marie's first Top 30 hit on the US Hot R&B Singles chart for 14 years, peaking at #23. It was nominated for a Grammy Award in 2005 in the category Best Female R&B Vocal Performance.

The follow-up single "A Rose By Any Other Name", a duet with Gerald Levert peaked at #53 on the US Hot R&B Singles chart.

She performed "My Body's Hungry" on The Parkers in 2000.

Track listing 
All songs written by Teena Marie, except where noted.
 "La Doña Intro" – 2:15
 "Still In Love" (Al Green, Marie, Byron Thomas) – 4:16
 "Honey Call" (Marie, Pamela Williams) – 4:21
 "Baby I'm Your Fiend" (James Allen, Marie) – 4:56
 "My Body's Hungry" – 5:33
 "A Rose by Any Other Name" with Gerald Levert – 5:27
 "Off the Chain" – 4:37 Performed by Teena Marie and Birdman
 "Makavelli Never Lied" (Allen, Marie) – 5:06
 "Revelations 3:8 Introduction" (Common, Marie) – 0:30  Performed by Teena Marie and Common
 "Recycle Hate to Love" – 4:52  Performed by Teena Marie, Lady Levi and Alia Rose
 "The Mackin' Game" (Allen, Marie, MC Lyte, Medusa) – 5:34  Performed by Teena Marie, MC Lyte and Medusa
 "I Love Him Too" – 5:28  Performed by Teena Marie and DeDe O'Neal
 "I Got You" (Rick James, Marie) – 4:21 Performed by Teena Marie and Rick James
 "Hit Me Where I Live" (Allen, Doug Grigsby, Marie) – 5:05
 "High Yellow Girl" – 4:58 Performed by Teena Marie and Alia Rose
 "Black Rain" – 4:27
 "I'm on Fire" – 5:32

Charts

Weekly charts

Year-end charts

References

Teena Marie albums
2004 albums
Cash Money Records albums
Hip hop albums by American artists